The Republic of Venice organized its first formal public bank in 1587, the Banco della Piazza di Rialto. This followed earlier proposals and the steady collapse during the 16th century of the Republic's private banks. Another public bank, the Banco del Giro, was established in 1619.

Long before the creation of these banks, Venice was a pioneer in banking and finance in the public and private sectors, known throughout Europe for perfecting the system of double-entry bookkeeping and conducting business through book entry transactions. Several 19th century authors described a "Bank of Venice" formed in the 12th century, calling it Europe's first national bank and an innovator of non-redeemable debt-based money. Archival research corrected these accounts, distinguishing between the Republic's financing offices, the business of its private bankers, and the much later public banks.

Grain Office and imprestiti
In 1282 the Republic organized most public finance activities under its Grain Office, which subsequently did a banking business on behalf of the government. It accepted time deposits from wealthy citizens and foreigners, and advanced loans to government departments and private enterprises. To ensure the availability of funds, the government mandated the deposit of some types of savings, such as dowries, at the Grain Office. The office ran into difficulty in the mid-14th century and was liquidated. By that time the Republic had extended legal tender status to transfers on the books of private bankers. In return for this privilege, the bankers were expected to lend to the government.

The system of emergency loans (imprestiti) was a widely used saving and investment option. The Republic collected these loans as early the twelfth century, demanding from each propertied citizen a fraction of his wealth. The loans were voluntary at first and later compulsory, and were repaid over time from public revenues. In 1262 the Republic consolidated its loans into one loan called the Monte (Fund) that paid 5 percent interest. Repayment of loan principal continued until 1365, after which only interest was paid. In 1375 the Republic added the option of buying back its debt on the open market. Shares of the Monte could not be withdrawn at par value and therefore were not deposits, but they were readily transferable on the books of the Chamber of Loans. The Republic kept up payments on this "old fund" (Monte Vecchio) until the War of Ferrara, at which point it defaulted and introduced a new debt series, the Monte Nuovo, followed by the Monte Nuovissimo during the War of the League of Cambrai in 1509.

Legendary twelfth-century bank
These financial innovations gave rise to a legend that the Banco del Giro had been created in the twelfth century. According to this legend, the Republic collected a prestito in 1157 or 1171 to support its trade wars against the Byzantine Empire. When the Byzantine–Venetian war of 1171 ended in a disastrous defeat, the Republic was ruined and Doge Vitale II Michiel was assassinated. With no means of repaying the loan, the Republic promptly converted it to a perpetual annuity (or in some accounts, offered lenders nothing at all). The legend claims that citizens adopted this imaginary money, finding it more convenient than coins, and the Chamber of Loans became the public bank.

Henry Dunning Macleod's Theory and Practice of Banking called the establishment of a public bank in the twelfth century a "great current delusion," while at the same time arguing that the Monti were important forerunners of deposit banking. Sidney Dean's History of Banking collected several descriptions of the supposed early bank. It noted that researchers had been unable to find documentation of the bank as described, but dismissed this as an oversight of the Venetians. Charles F. Dunbar reiterated the weakness of the legend in 1892. He presented recently published archives as evidence that private deposit bankers operated in Venice by 1318 and were its only bankers until 1584. He made no mention of the activities of the Grain Office, which were examined only later.

Introduction of public banking

The private bankers' book-transfer money was convenient but not stable in value. To address this problem, a public bank was proposed in the Senate as early as 1356 and again in 1374, but was not adopted. In the 16th century failures of Venetian private banks became a regular occurrence, amid several unsuccessful attempts at regulation, and the surviving banks' deposits were valued below the same quantity in coins. The last bank, that of Pisano & Tiepolo, failed in 1584, whereupon an act to establish a public bank was passed and then immediately repealed. Three years passed without a bank, and then the Senate passed essentially the same act again. This bank, the Banco della Piazza di Rialto, was a full-reserve bank guaranteed and inspected by the state that dealt only in deposits and transfers. Cheque service was added in 1593 with a law that required citizens to settle all bills of exchange at the Bank. Citizens indeed came to prefer transfers through the Bank to cash payments, although for very different reasons than those described in the legend. The Banco del Giro (Bank of Circulation) was later established to serve a similar purpose, but also in the short run to finance a silver contract for the Venetian mint and several other public debts. The Banco di Rialto was wound down in 1637 and the Banco del Giro continued in business until the Fall of the Republic in 1797.

See also
 Bank of Saint George, a Genovese public bank founded in 1407
 Consol (bond)
 Giro (banking)

References

Economy of the Republic of Venice
Medieval banking
History of Venice